Blanca Martínez Suárez (born 21 October 1988) is a Spanish actress. She is best known for her performances on television series The Boarding School (2007–10), The Boat (2011–13), and the Spanish Language Netflix series' Las chicas del cable (English: Cable Girls) (2017–2020) and Jaguar (2021-).

She has also worked with Pedro Almodóvar in films as The Skin I Live In (2011), which earned her a Goya Award nomination as Best New Actress, and I'm So Excited! (2013).

Acting career

2007–2012: Early work and rise to prominence 
Suárez made her acting debut in 2007, portraying the role of Julia Medina in the Antena 3 series The Boarding School (Spanish: El internado). She would star the series until its end in 2010, and earn Fotogramas de Plata Award for Best Actress for her performance, as well as a Golden Nymph for Best Actress – Drama nomination at the Monte-Carlo Television Festival in 2009. In the meantime, Suárez appeared in full-length pictures Shiver (Eskalofrío), Cowards (Cowards), Brain Drain (Fuga de cerebros) and The Consul of Sodom (El cónsul de Sodoma), as well as in the short films Universes (Universos) and Hemisphere (Hemisferio).

In 2010, Suárez had her first starring role in Neon Flesh (Carne de neón) opposite Mario Casas. The film was eventually released in 2011. Suárez then starred, along with Antonio Banderas and Elena Anaya, Pedro Almodóvar's The Skin I Live In, for which she earned critical acclaim and a Goya Award for Best New Actress nomination. The same year, she appeared in the music video for Ladrones' song "Estoy prohibido".

Suárez then went on to star another Antena 3 series The Boat (El Barco), for which she won Fotogramas de Plata Award for Best Television Actress and Ondas Award for Best Actress, as well as a nomination for TP de Oro Award for Best Actress. The Boat aired from 17 January 2011 to 21 February 2013. In the meantime, Suárez starred two films that both premiered at the 2012 Málaga Film Festival — the comedy drama Winning Streak (The Pelayos), along with Daniel Brühl, Lluís Homar and Miguel Ángel Silvestre, and Imanol Uribe's post-war drama Orange Syrup (Miel de naranjas), alongside Ángela Molina and Nora Navas.

2013–present: Established career 

In 2013, Suárez appeared in I'm So Excited! (Los amantes pasajeros), an ensemble cast comedy film directed by Pedro Almodóvar. At the 2013 Cannes Film Festival, Suárez was awarded with the Trophée Chopard for Female Revelation of the Year for her work in acting; the award was presented to her by Colin Firth.

In 2014, Suárez portrayed Snow White in the eponymous episode of the television series Cuéntame un cuento (English: Tell Me a Story). In 2015, she starred the miniseries Los nuestros (English: The Ours) opposite Hugo Silva; the television series Carlos, Rey Emperador (English: Charles, King Emperor) as Isabella of Portugal; and films Perdiendo el Norte (English: Off Course), opposite her The Boarding School co-star Yon González, My Big Night (Mi gran noche) by Álex de la Iglesia, for which she was nominated for Best Supporting Actress at the III Premios Feroz. and also Álex de la Iglesia's next film El bar (2017).

Other work 
Suárez appeared in music videos for "Estoy prohibido" by Ladrones in 2010 and "Emocional" by Dani Martín in 2014.

Also to modeled for various recognized magazines. In 2013, she became model for the Italian lingerie label Intimissimi.

Since February 2014, Suárez has been writing a blog for the Vogue España.

Media and personal life 
Suárez was named the Most Searched Performer on the Internet by the Fotogramas in 2011 and 2014, and was voted out as the best dressed celebrity at the 26th Goya Awards. In November of the same year, she was named the Woman of the Year by the Spanish edition of GQ.

Suárez was in a relationship with actor Javier Pereira from 2008 to 2010. She then dated and lived with her Winning Streak co-star Miguel Ángel Silvestre from 2011 to 2014. In 2014, Suárez briefly dated Spanish pop rock musician Dani Martín. From 2015 to 2017, she was in a relationship with actor Joel Bosqued. Later from March 2018 to October 2019, she was in another relationship with Mario Casas.
In the last three years Suarez is in a relationship with the actor Javier Rey.

She has a dachshund named Pistacho.

Filmography

Awards and nominations

References

External links 
 

1988 births
Living people
Actresses from Madrid
Spanish female models
Spanish film actresses
Spanish television actresses
21st-century Spanish actresses
Chicas Almodóvar
Chopard Trophy for Female Revelation winners